is a fishing video game for the Nintendo 64. It was released only in Japan in 2000. The Sequel to Nushi Tsuri 64 which was released 1998. It was compatible with Kawa no Nushi Tsuri 4 for Game Boy Color via the Transfer Pak.

See also
List of River King video games

References

2000 video games
Fishing video games
Games with Transfer Pak support
Japan-exclusive video games
Nintendo 64 games
Nintendo 64-only games
Single-player video games
Video games developed in Japan
Victor Interactive Software games